The 2012 MBC Drama Awards is a ceremony honoring the outstanding achievement in television on the Munhwa Broadcasting Corporation (MBC) network for the year of 2012. It was held on December 30, 2012 and hosted by actor Kim Jaewon and actress Son Dam-bi.

Nominations and winners
(Winners denoted in bold)

References

External links
http://www.imbc.com/broad/tv/ent/event/2012mbc/

MBC Drama Awards
MBC Drama Awards
MBC Drama Awards
December 2012 events in South Korea